Joe Puerta (born 2 July 1951, California, US) is the bassist/vocalist and founder of the American rock group Ambrosia. He co-wrote one of the band's early hits, "Holdin' On To Yesterday" (1975).

He was a touring member (bass/vocals) of the bands for Chi Coltrane, Laura Branigan, and Sheena Easton. He later became an original member of Bruce Hornsby and the Range. His association with Bruce Hornsby started when Hornsby was invited to play sessions with Ambrosia on their last album.

In 2020, Joe married his tour manager and long-time fan Shannon Marie Killala on Star Vista’s 70’s Rock and Romance Cruise during a unique concert/wedding with his Ambrosia bandmates (Chris North best man, Burleigh Drummond officiating) and friends John Ford Coley, Peter Beckett, and Stephen Bishop.  He resides in southern California.

References

External links
 Official website
 Official Ambrosia website
 The Exchange Recording Complex official website
 Joe Puerta Bruuuce.com wiki entry

1952 births
Living people
People from Lomita, California
American rock bass guitarists
American male bass guitarists
American rock singers
Ambrosia (band) members
Bruce Hornsby and the Range members
American male guitarists
20th-century American guitarists